Kureh Kharem (also Romanized as Kūreh Kharem) is a village in Sardar-e Jangal Rural District, Sardar-e Jangal District, Fuman County, Gilan Province, Iran. At the 2006 census, its population was 208, in 51 families.

References 

Populated places in Fuman County